Koroneia is a former municipality in the Thessaloniki regional unit, Greece. Since the 2011 local government reform it is part of the municipality Lagkadas, of which it is a municipal unit. Population 4,092 (2011). The seat of the municipality was in Gerakarou. The municipal unit Koroneia has an area of 105.613 km2.

References

Populated places in Thessaloniki (regional unit)